Polac or (sometimes transliterated as Poljance) is a village in Kosovo. The village is exclusively inhabited by ethnic Albanians; in the 2011 census, it had 2701 inhabitants.

Geography 
It lies in the Drenica region, at the source of the Vrbica river, a left confluence of the Drenica river. It lies on both sides of the regional Skenderaj-Glogavac road, 4–7 km southeast of Skenderaj. It is 640–680 m over sea level. The rural settlement lies on a cadastral area with the a total of 2195 hectares (K.O. Staro Poljance 694, K.O. Novo Poljance 767, K.O. Kraljica 734 ha).

Poljance includes two major physiognomic parts: Staro Poljance (Džamijska, Gruda, Koca, Veljić and Zonić Mahala) and Novo Poljance, of which the latter was administratively joined into the present settlement in 1975. Novo Poljance was an independent village before, situated to the east, established after World War I, with Serb and Montenegrin settlers from the vicinity of Danilovgrad, Nikšić, Mrkonjić Grad, Bosanska Krupa, among others.

History

Middle Ages 

The 1330 Dečani chrysobulls of Serbian King Stephen Uroš III (r. 1322–1331) mention the great village of "Strelac", and several surrounding villages: Čigotovo (Čikatovo), Vrbovec, Poljance, Glabotino and Kudrino (Kudrin). Toponomastic study shows that Poljance bordered Strelac on the northeast.

World War II 

6 soldiers, hailing from Poljance, of the "Boro Bukmirović" and "Razim Sadiku" battalions of the First Macedonian-Kosovan National liberation Brigade (Yugoslav Partisans) fell in January and February 1945.

Kosovo War 

According to the Serbian newspaper Pravda in January in February 1997, Jonuz Veliqi, an Albanian official working for the state structures of the Republic of Serbia, was nearly killed by during attacks of the Albanian paramilitaries. On August 3, 1998, a civilian worker for the Serbian Interior Ministry was wounded by an automatic weapon. Poljance was in the hands of the Kosovo Liberation Army until March 22, 1999, when Serbian police forces launched an offensive into Drenica. After March 23, 1999, several abducted ethnic Serbs were held prisoners in an old mine near a brick factory in Poljance by Albanians.

Demographics

Annotations

Notes

References 
Božanić, S. 2009, "O zemljišnim međama srpskog srednjovekovnog sela", Istraživanja, no. 20, pp. 47–64.
Srboljub Đ Stamenković, Географска енциклопедија населjа Србије: С-Ш, Volume 4, Географски факултет, 2002, p. 81: "Пољанце"

Villages in Skenderaj
Drenica